G. G. Mayekar was a Bollywood film editor from India who edited many Hindi and Marathi films, notably the famous films Shree 420 (1955), Jis Desh Men Ganga Behti Hai (1960).

Career
The contributions from editor G. G. Mayekar, cinematographer Radhu Karmakar and art director M. R. Acharekar were significant to veteran actor Raj Kapoor and R. K. Studios' success. His other notable films he worked on include Barsaat (1949), Awara (1951), Ashiana (1952), Aah (1953), Boot Polish (1954), Teesri Kasam (1966), Rajnigandha (1972) and many others.

Awards and nominations

Filmfare Awards
Filmfare Award for Best Editing

Filmography

References

External links

Filmfare Awards winners
Date of birth missing
Artists from Mumbai
Hindi film editors
Marathi film editors
Film editors from Maharashtra
Best Editor National Film Award winners